Tite may refer to:

People
Tite (football manager) (born 1961), Brazilian footballer, trainer and manager
Tite (footballer, born 1930) (1930–2004), Brazilian footballer
Tite Curet Alonso (1926–2003), Puerto Rican composer
Tite Kubo (born 1977), Japanese manga artist
Tite Margwelaschwili, (1891–1946), Georgian philosopher and writer
Andrew Tite (born 1981), Canadian actor
Karen Tite, English actress
William Tite (1798–1873), British architect and politician

Places
 Tite (Guinea-Bissau), an area of Guinea-Bissau
 Saint-Tite, Quebec, a town in Canada
 Tite Street, a street in London, England

External links
species:Gerald Edward Tite, British entomologist (at Wikispecies)